The following is a bibliography of Charles W. Morris.

Books by Charles W. Morris
Some books are available for viewing online.

 Charles W. Morris (1925). Symbolism and Reality: A Study in the Nature of Mind. Dissertation, University of Chicago. Reprinted, Amsterdam: John Benjamins, 1993. Translated into German, Symbolik und Realitat, with an introduction by A. Eschbach. Frankfurt: Suhrkamp, 1981.
 Charles W. Morris (1932). Six Theories of Mind. Chicago: University of Chicago. Reprinted, 1966.
 Charles W. Morris (1937). Logical Positivism, Pragmatism and Scientific Empiricism. Paris: Hermann et Cie. Reprinted, New York: AMS Press, 1979.
 Charles W. Morris (1942). Paths of Life: Preface to a World Religion. New York: Harper and Brothers.
 Charles W. Morris (1946). Signs, Language and Behavior. New York: Prentice-Hall, 1946. Reprinted, New York: George Braziller, 1955. Reprinted in Charles Morris, Writings on the General Theory of Signs (The Hague: Mouton, 1971), pp. 73–397. Translated into Italian, Segni, linguaggio e comportamento, by S. Ceccato. Milan. Translated into German, Zeichen, Sprache und Verhalten, by A. Eschbach and G. Kopsch. Düsseldorf: Schwann, 1973.
 Charles W. Morris (1948). The Open Self. New York: Prentice-Hall; Translated into Swedish, Öppna Er Själv by Ann Bouleau. Stockholm: 1949.
 Charles W. Morris (1956). Varieties of Human Value. Chicago: University of Chicago Press. Reprinted, 1973.
 Charles W. Morris (1964). Signification and Significance: A Study of the Relations of Signs and Values. Cambridge, Mass.: MIT Press. Chap. 1, "Signs and the Act," is reprinted in Charles Morris, Writings on the General Theory of Signs (The Hague: Mouton, 1971), pp. 401–414.
 Charles W. Morris (1970). The Pragmatic Movement in American Philosophy. New York: George Braziller.
 Charles W. Morris (1971). Writings on the General Theory of Signs. Den Haag: Mouton.
 Charles W. Morris (1973). Cycles. Gainesville: University of Florida Press.
 Charles W. Morris (1975). Zeichen Wert Äesthetik. Mit einer Einleitung hg. u. übers. v. A. Eschbach. Frankfurt: Suhrkamp.
 Charles W. Morris (1976). Image. New York: Vantage Press.
 Charles W. Morris (1977). Pragmatische Semiotik und Handlungstheorie. Mit einer Einleitung hg. und übers. v. A. Eschbach. Frankfurt: Suhrkamp.

Other works by Charles W. Morris
Some works are available for viewing online.

 "The Total-Situation Theory of Ethics." International Journal of Ethics 37 (1927): 258-268.
 "The Concept of the Symbol I." Journal of Philosophy 24 (1927): 253-262.
 "The Concept of the Symbol II." Journal of Philosophy 24 (1927): 281-291.
 "Review of G. Lanoe-Villene, Le Livre des Symboles: Dictionnaire de Symbolique et de Mythologie." Journal of Philosophy 24 (1927): 581-583.
 "The Prediction Theory of Truth." Monist 38 (1928): 387-401.
 "Neo-Pragmatism and the Ways of Knowing." Monist 38 (1928): 494-501.
 "Has Russell Passed the Tortoise?" Journal of Philosophy 26 (1929): 449-459.
 "The Relation of Formal to Instrumental Logic." In T. V. Smith and W. K. Wright, eds, Essays in Philosophy (Chicago: University of Chicago, 1929), pp. 253–268.
 "The Nature of Mind." Three lectures delivered at the Rice Institute on January 6, 13, and 20, 1929. Rice Institute Pamphlet, vol. 16, no. 44 (Houston, 1929), pp. 153–244.
 "Review of A. Spaier, La Penseé Concrète: Essai sur le symbolisme intellectual." Philosophical Review 38 (1929) 407-410.
 "Review of G. A. De Laguna, Speech, Its Function and Development."
 "Review of J. F. Markey, The Symbolic Process and Its Integration in Children." Philosophical Review 38 (1929): 612-615.
 "Review of The Problem of Truth: University of California Lectures Delivered before the Philosophical Union, 1927-28." Journal of Philosophy 26 (1929): 356-360.
 "A Reply to Prof. Schilpp." Monist 40 (1930): 321-323.
 "Review of H. Dingier, Metaphysik der Wissenschaft vom Letzten." Philosophical Review 39 (1930): 508-513.
 "Review of University of California Publications in Philosophy, vol. 2: Studies in the Nature of Truth." Journal of Philosophy 27 (1930): 210-215.
 "Mind in Process and Reality." Journal of Philosophy 28 (1931): 113-127.
 "Review of C. A. Strong, Essays on the Natural Origin of the Mind." Philosophical Review 40 (1931): 590-592.
 "Truth, Action, and Verification." Monist 42 (1932): 321-329.
 "Review of L. A. Dewe, Les deux ordres, psychique et matériel." Philosophical Review 41 (1932): 87-88.
 "Review of G. F. Stout, Mind and Matter." Philosophical Review 41 (1932): 410-413.
 "Review of T. Whittaker, Prolegomena to a New Metaphysics." Ethics 42 (1932): 470-471.
 "Review of D. S. Robinson, An Introduction to Living Philosophy." Ethics 42 (1932): 469-470.
 "Review of J. Wahl, Vers le Concret: Etudes d'Histoire de la Philosophie Contemporaine." Journal of Philosophy 30 (1933): 714-716.
 Pragmatism and the Crisis of Democracy. Public Policy Pamphlet No. 12. Chicago: University of Chicago, 1934.
 "Introduction." To George H. Mead, Mind, Self, and Society. Chicago: University of Chicago, 1934.
 "Pragmatism and Metaphysics." Philosophical Review 43 (1934): 549-564. Reprinted in Logical Positivism, Pragmatism, and Scientific Empiricism (Paris: Hermann et Cie., 1937), pp. 31–45.
 "Review of R. W. Sellars, The Philosophy of Physical Realism." Philosophical Review 43 (1934): 205-208.
 "Brief Bibliography of Contemporary Scientific Philosophy in the United States." Erkenntnis 5 (1935) 195-199.
 "Philosophy of Science and Science of Philosophy." Philosophy of Science 2 (1935): 271-286. Reprinted in Logical Positivism, Pragmatism, and Scientific Empiricism (Paris: Hermann et Cie., 1937), pp. 7–21. An abstract is in Journal of Philosophy 32 (1935): 292.
 "The Relation of the Formal and Empirical Science within Scientific Empiricism." Erkenntnis 5 (1935) 6-14. Reprinted in Logical Positivism, Pragmatism, and Scientific Empiricism (Paris: Hermann et Cie., 1937), pp. 46–55.
 "Some Aspects of Recent American Scientific Philosophy." Erkenntnis 5 (1935–36) 142-151.
 "Review of F. C. S. Schiller, Must Philosophers Disagree?" Personalist 16 (1935): 388-390.
 "Professor Schiller and Pragmatism." Personalist 17 (1936): 294-300.
 "Semiotic and Scientific Empiricism." In Actes du Congrès International de Philosophie Scientifique 1935, vol. 1 (Paris: 1936), pp. 2–16. Reprinted in Logical Positivism, Pragmatism, and Scientific Empiricism (Paris: Hermann et Cie., 1937), pp. 56–71.
 "Remarks on the Proposed Encyclopaedia." Actes du Congrès International de Philosophie Scientique. vol. 2: Unité de la Science (Paris: 1936), pp. 71–74.
 "The Concept of Meaning in Pragmatism and Logical Positivism." In Actes du Huitième Congrès International de Philosophie, Prague, Czechoslovakia, 2–7 September 1936 (Prague: 1936. Rpt., Nendeln und Liechtenstein: Kraus Reprint, 1968), pp. 130–138. Reprinted in Logical Positivism, Pragmatism, and Scientific Empiricism (Paris: Hermann et Cie., 1937), pp. 22–30.
 "Review of Einheit der Wissenschaften: Prager Vorkonferenz der Internationalen Kongresse für Einheit der Wissenschaft." Philosophy of Science 3 (1936): 542-543.
 "Review of O. Neurath, Le dévéloppement du Cercle de Vienne et l'avenir de 1'empirisme logique." Philosophy of Science 3 (1936): 542-543.
 "Symposium of Unified Science." Philosophy of Science 4 (1937): 496-498.
 "The Unity of Science Movement and the United States." Synthese 3 (1938): 25-29.
 "Introduction." To George H. Mead, The Philosophy of the Act, ed. Charles W. Morris, in collaboration with J. M. Brewster, A. M. Dunham and D.L. Miller (Chicago: University of Chicago 1938), pp. vii-lxxiii.
 "Scientific Empiricism." International Encyclopedia of Unified Science, ed. Otto Neurath, vol. 1, no. 1 (Chicago: University of Chicago Press, 1938), pp 63–75.
 "Foundations of the Theory of Signs." International Encyclopedia of Unified Science, ed. Otto Neurath, vol. 1 no. 2. (Chicago: University of Chicago Press, 1938. Rpt, Chicago: University of Chicago Press, 1970–71). Reprinted in Charles Morris, Writings on the General Theory of Signs (The Hague: Mouton, 1971), pp. 13–71. Translated into Italian, Lineamenti di una teoria dei segni, by F. Rossi-Landi, with his introduction and commentary. Turin, Milano, Padua: 1963. Translated into German, Grundlagen der Zeichentheorie: Äesthetik und Zeichentheorie, by R. Posner and J. Rehbein. Munchen: Hanser, 1972. Translated into Spanish, Fundamentos de la teoría de los signos, by Rafael Grasa. Barcelona: Paidós, 1985.
 "Peirce, Mead and Pragmatism." Philosophical Review 47 (1938): 109-127.
 "General Education and the Unity of Science Movement." In John Dewey and the Promise of America, Progressive Education Booklet No. 14 (Columbus, Ohio: Progressive Education Association 1939), pp. 26–40.
 "Science, Art and Technology." Kenyon Review 1 (1939): 409-423.
 "Esthetics and the Theory of Signs." Erkenntnis 8 (1939): 131-150. Reprinted in Charles Morris, Writings on the General Theory of Signs (The Hague: Mouton, 1971), pp. 415–433.
 "Review of P. W. Bridgman, The Intelligent Individual and Society." Review of Scientific Instruments 10 (1939): 122.
 "Semiotic, the Socio-Humanistic Sciences, and the Unity of Science." Erkenntnis 9 (1940).
 "Knowledge and Social Practice." Frontiers of Democracy 6 (1940): 150-152.
 "The Mechanism of Freedom." In Freedom, Its Meaning, ed. R.N. Anshen (New York: 1940), pp. 579–589.
 "The Search for a Life of Significance. The Work of Raymond Jonson, American Painter." Tomorrow 1 (1941): 16-21.
 "Review of P. Frank, Between Physics and Philosophy." Astrophysical Journal 94 (1941): 555.
 "Empiricism, Religion, and Democracy." In Science, Philosophy, and Religion: Second Symposium, ed. L. Bryson, ed. (New York: 1942), pp. 213–242.
 "William James Today." In Commemoration to William James, ed. Horace M. Kallen, ed. (New York: 1942). pp. 178–187.
 "Freedom or Frustration." Fortune 28 (1943): 148-152 and 162-174.
 "Commentary on A. Kaplan, ‘Content Analysis and the Theory of Signs’." Philosophy of Science 10 (1943): 230-247 and 247-249.
 "The Social Assimilation of Cultural Relativity." In Approaches to World Peace, ed. L. Bryson et al. (New York: 1944), pp. 619–626.
 "Liberation from the Machine Mind." Biosophical Review 7 (1944): 9-10.
 "Review of A. S. Clayton, Emergent Mind and Education: A Study of George H. Mead's Bio-Social Behaviorism from an Educational Point of View." Journal of Philosophy 41 (1944): 108-109.
 "Review of National Society of College Teachers of Education, Yearbook no. 28: The Discipline of Practical Judgment in a Democratic Society." Journal of Philosophy 41 (1944): 302-304.
 "Communication: Its Forms and Problems." In Approaches to National Unity, ed. L. Bryson (New York: 1945), pp. 635–643.
 "Nietzsche, An Evaluation." Journal of the History of Ideas 6 (1945): 285-293.
 "The Significance of the Unity of Science Movement." Philosophy and Phenomenological Research 6 (1946): 508-515.
 "Science and Discourse." Synthese 5 (1946): 296-308.
 "To the Editors of the Journal of Philosophy." Journal of Philosophy 43 (1946): 196.
 "To the Editors of the Journal of Philosophy." Journal of Philosophy 43 (1946): 363-364.
 "Linguistics and the Theory of Signs." Word 2 (1946): 85.
 "Philosophy as Symbolic Synthesis of Belief." Sixth Conference on Science, Philosophy, and Religion (1945). In Approaches to Group Understanding, ed. L. Bryson et al. (New York: 1947), pp. 626–631.
 "Testimony of American Youth." New York Herald Tribune, 26 October 1947.
 "Multiple Self and Multiple Society." In Freedom and Experience: Essays presented to H. M. Kallen, ed. Sidney Hook and Milton R. Konvitz (Ithaca: Cornell University Press, 1947), pp. 70–78.
 "Review of H. W. Schneider, A History of American Philosophy." Nation (1947): 225-226.
 "Signs about Signs about Signs." Philosophy and Phenomenological Research 9 (1948): 115-133. Reprinted in Charles Morris, Writings on the General Theory of Signs (The Hague: Mouton, 1971), pp. 434–455.
 "Comments on Mr. Storer's Paper." Philosophy of Science 15 (1948): 330-332.
 "Recent Studies in Meaning and Communication." Sigma 2 (1948): 454-458.
 "The Three Primary Forms of Discourse." In The Language of Wisdom and Folly, ed. I.J. Lee (New York: 1949), pp. 31–39.
 "Entrance to Asia." Chuo Koron (1949): 19-23.
 "Individual Differences and Cultural Patterns." In Personality in Nature, Society, and Culture, ed. C. Kluckhohn and H.A. Murray (New York: 1949), pp. 131–143.
 "Comments on the Paper by Jean A. Phillips." Philosophy of Science 17 (1950): 354-355.
 "Comparative Strength of Life-Ideals in Eastern and Western Cultures." In Essays in East-West Philosophy, ed. C.A. Moore (Honolulu: 1951), pp. 353–370.
 "Biosophical Themes and Human Values?" Biosophical Review 11 (1951): 16-18.
 "The Science of Man and Unified Science." Proceedings of the American Academy of Arts and Sciences 80 (1951): 37-44.
 "Similarity of Constitutional Factors in Psychotic Behavior in India, China and the United States." American Journal of Psychiatry 108 (1951): 143-144.
 "Axiology as the Science of Preferential Behavior." In Value: A Cooperative Inquiry, ed. R. Lepley (New York: 1951), pp. 211–222.
 "Comments on Mysticism and its Language." ETC. A Review of General Semantics 9 (1951–52): 3-8.
 "Review of K. Burke, A Rhetoric of Motives." Review of Metaphysics 4 (1951): 439-443.
 "Review of A. W. Watts, The Supreme Identity." Philosophy East and West 1 (1951): 77-79.
 "Significance, Signification, and Paintings." Methodos 5 (1953): 87-102. Reprinted in Symbols and Value, ed. L. Bryson (New York: 1954), pp. 563–575.
 "Symbols, Values and Philosophy." Audio recorded in 1953, 20 minutes. New York: McGraw-Hill, 1969. New York: Jeffrey Norton, 1981.
 "Review of R. B. Perry, Realms of Value." Annuals of the American Academy of Political and Social Sciences 295 (1954): 179-180.
 "Value Scales and Dimensions." Journal of Abnormal and Social Psychology 51 (1955): 523-535.
 "Toward a Unified Theory of Human Behavior." In Toward a Unified Theory of Human Behavior, ed. R.R. Grinker (New York: 1956), pp. 350–351.
 "Varieties of Human Value." Humanist 16 (1956): 153-161.
 "Return to Nature." Time (Atlantic edition) 67 (1956): 41.
 "Relations of Temperament to the Choice of Values." Journal of Abnormal and Social Psychology 53 (1956): 345-349.
 "Paintings, Ways to Live, and Values." In Sign Image Symbol, ed. G. Kepes (New York: 1956), pp. 144–149.
 "Man-Cosmos Symbols." In The New Landscape in Art and Science, ed. G. Kepes (Chicago: 1956), pp. 98–99. Reprinted in Charles Morris, Writings on the General Theory of Signs (The Hague: Mouton, 1971), pp. 464–466.
 "Review of L. Bryson et al., Symbols and Society." Contemporary Psychology 1 (1956): 216-217.
 "Review of P. Edwards, The Logic of Moral Discourse." Annuals of the American Academy of Political and Social Sciences 307 (1956): 181.
 "Review of S. Uyade, Logical Positivism: Essays in Philosophical Analysis and Language, Meaning and Value." Philosophy and Phenomenological Research 17 (1956–57): 265-266.
 "Mysticism and Its Language." In Language: An Enquiry into Its Meaning and Function, ed. R. N. Anshen (New York: 1957), pp. 179–187. Reprinted in Charles Morris, Writings on the General Theory of Signs (The Hague: Mouton, 1971), pp. 456–463.
 "A Comment on Dr. Paul Oppenheim's Dimension of Knowledge." Revue Internationale de Philosophie 40 (1957) Fasc. 2.
 "Philosophy and the Behavioral Sciences in the United States." Chinese Journal of Contemporary Philosophy and Social Sciences (1957): 1-8.
 "Review of K. R. Boulding, The Image: Knowledge in Life and Society." American Sociological Review 22 (1957): 112-113.
 "Review of H. Welch, The Parting of the Way: Lao Tzu and the Taoist Movement." American Sociological Review 22 (1957): 494.
 "Review of M. Natason, The Social Dynamics of George Herbert Mead." Ethics 67 (1957): 145-146.
 "Prospects for a New Synthesis: Science and the Humanities as Complementary Activities." In Science and the Modern Mind, ed. G. Holton (Boston: 1958).
 "Words without Meaning." Contemporary Psychology 3 (1958): 212-214.
 "Edward Scribner Ames As Philosopher." The Scroll: The Journal of the Campbell Institute (Chicago) 44 (1958): 7-10.
 "Philosophy, Psychiatry, Mental Illness and Health." Philosophy and Phenomenological Research 20 (1959–60): 47-55.
 "Values of Psychiatric Patients." Behavioral Science 5 (1960): 297-312.
 "On the History of the International Encyclopaedia of Unified Science." Synthese 12 (1960): 517-521.
 "Analysis of the Connotative Meanings of a Variety of Human Values as Expressed by American College Students." Journal of Abnormal and Social Psychology 62 (1961): 62-73.
 "Values, Problematic and Unproblematic, and Science." Journal of Communication 11 (1961): 205-210.
 "On the History of the International Encyclopedia of Unified Science." In Logic and Language: Festschrift R. Carnap (Dordrecht: 1962), pp. 242–246.
 "Pragmatism and Logical Empiricism." In The Philosophy of Rudolf Carnap, ed. Paul A. Schilpp (New York: 1963), pp. 87–98.
 "Otto Neurath and the Unity of Science Movement." Jerusalem: 1964.
 "George H. Mead: A Pragmatist's Philosophy of Science." In Scientific Psychology: Principles and Approaches, ed. Benjamin B. Wolman and Ernest Nagel (New York: Basic Books, 1965), pp. 402–408.
 "Aesthetics, Signs and Icons." Philosophy and Phenomenological Research 25 (1964–65): 356-364.
 "On the Unity of the Pragmatic Movement." Rice University Studies vol. 51 no. 4 (1965): 109-119.
 "Alfred Adler and George H. Mead." Journal of Individual Psychology 21 (1965): 199-200.
 "Technique and Human Value." Symposium on the Technological Society, the Center for the Study of Democratic Institutions, Santa Barbara, California, 19–23 December 1965.
 Festival. New York: George Braziller, 1966.
 "Comment on 'Counseling without Assuming Free Will'." Personnel and Guidance Journal 45 (1966): 217-218.
 "Foreword" to the Italian translation of "Esthetics and the Theory of Signs" and "Esthetics, Signs, and Icons." Nuova corrente 42-43 (1967): 113-119.
 "A Tribute to Daisetz Teitaro Suzuki." The Eastern Buddhist, new series 2 (1967): 128-129.
 "Religion and the Empirical Study of Human Values." Religious Humanism 1 (1967): 74-75.
 "Thirteen Ways to Live – A Report on Reactions of Readers of Religious Humanism." Religious Humanism 2 (1968): 85-86.
 "G. H. Mead als Sozialpsychologe und Sozialphilosoph." In George H. Mead, Geist, Identität und Gesellschaft (Frankfurt: Suhrkamp 1968), pp. 13–39.
 "The Symbol Maitreya." Maitreya 1 (1970): 4-6.
 "Changes in Conceptions of the Good Life by American Students from 1950 to 1970." Journal of Personality and Social Psychology 20 (1971): 254-260.
 "Sprechen und menschliches Handeln." In Philosophische Anthropologie, vol. 7, no. 2., ed. Hans Georg Gadamer and P. Vogler (Stuttgart: 1975), pp. 235–251.

Morris, Charles W.
Bibliographies of American writers
Philosophy bibliographies